Michael Raynor is an American actor, director and writer. He is best known for his role as Joseph Morgan in ER, Apollo 15 Astronaut Al Worden in From the Earth to the Moon, Mick in the movie A Brother's Kiss and Frank in the movie Federal Hill.

Early life
Michael Raynor was born Michael Roy Stearn in Queens, New York. He was raised on the Upper East Side of Manhattan bordering Spanish Harlem. At age 3, he attended Kindergarten Center in East Harlem.

Later, Raynor's mother moved him to PS 6. At this school, he was placed into the IGC program for gifted children. He went on to win a scholarship to Friends Seminary, a Quaker private school. There, he met and became best friends with Nick Chinlund, who was later his co-star in the movie A Brother's Kiss.

Spending 2 years at Friends Seminary, he attended Stuyvesant High School in New York City, being accepted after taking a test similar to the SAT. As a junior, his girlfriend was Marion Grodin, daughter of actor Charles Grodin. His first experience with creative writing and storytelling was through his English teacher, Pulitzer Prize winner Frank McCourt. At Stuyvesant, Raynor was captain of the basketball team playing the position of point guard. He was also a member of Lou d'Almeida's original Gauchos Basketball team in the Rucker Tournament at Rucker Park.

Early career
Raynor attended the University of Georgia and majored in International Relations. At that time, the department was run by former Kennedy and Johnson Secretary of State, Dean Rusk. While there, Raynor won a National Award for Debate in the Model United Nations during the United Nations Conference of Trade and Development forum as the chief delegate. The University of Georgia was awarded Outstanding Delegation during the same conference.

After college, Raynor worked on the floor of the New York Mercantile Exchange in Crude Oil Options and later transferred to the Commodity Exchange doing arbitrage between New York and Chicago in precious metals, gold and silver. After Black Monday, Raynor quit his job to become the personal night time driver of Steve Rubell of Studio 54. He began studying acting and martial arts with the Grand Master Kwon as well as Shihan William Oliver, 2-time Grand Champion at Madison Square Garden. He has also done modeling for Italian jeans manufacturer, Replay.

Acting
Michael Raynor first studied acting in New York with Fred Kareman, Bobby Lewis, Wynn Handman, Tim Phillips and George Morrison.

His theater credits began in a Greenwich Village basement cabaret opposite James Gandolfini, continuing on to Off-Broadway as he originated characters and new plays for emerging New York writers.

Michael wrote and performed the hit one man show, Who is Floyd Stearn? Off-Broadway to critical acclaim.

Raynor's film credits include leads in Shadow Boxing (1993), The Waiting Game (1999) (with Will Arnett), Tripfall (2000) (opposite Eric Roberts and John Ritter), The Reunion (1998), The First Man (1996) (opposite Leslie Ann Warren and Heather Graham), A Brother's Kiss (1997) (with Cathy Moriarty, Rosie Perez and John Leguizamo), Federal Hill (1994) (Deauville Film Festival Winner, Critics Award and Audience Award) as well as Allison Eastwood's, Rails & Ties (2007), The Pavilion (2004), Sonic Impact (2000) (with Ice-T), The Taxman (2008) (with Joe Pantoliano and Michael Chiklis), Mike Nichols’ Wolf (1994), The Advocate (2013) and For the Love of Money (2012).

His television work includes From the Earth to the Moon (as Apollo 15 astronaut Al Worden), Bella Mafia (opposite Jennifer Tilly), and In The Line of Duty: Hunt for Justice (opposite Nicholas Turturro, Adam Arkin and Melissa Leo), as well as guest starring roles on Criminal Minds, Castle, Southland, Law & Order: LA, Cold Case, CSI, ER, Law & Order, Shark, NYPD Blue, Brooklyn South, Brimstone, Everybody Hates Chris, and My Own Worst Enemy.

Directing and writing
Raynor first studied screenwriting with Robert McKee, renowned author of Story Structure, and was part of Ken Rotcop's ongoing Los Angeles Writing Workshop for several years.

Raynor developed and directed Butch Hammett's comic hit one-man show, Southern Discomfort, which was invited into the Comedy Central Stage in Los Angeles, and voted Critics Choice in Prague, Dublin and Edinburgh. He also co-wrote the screenplay version, which Chad and Carey Hayes are attached to produce.

In addition, Michael developed and originally staged Kathryn Graf's Surviving David, winner of Outstanding Solo Show - New York International Fringe Festival. He developed and directed Fia Perrera's Swimming Naked, and worked extensively with Jay Sefton, winner of LA Weekly's Best Actor in a Solo Play for The Most Mediocre Story Ever Told.

His screenplays include the adaptation of Mark Kriegel's award-winning novel Bless Me, Father, Proud Harry, Wilding, The Run, Dead Weight and the film adaptation of the Off-Broadway hit, Who Is Floyd Stearn?

Notable work

Who Is Floyd Stearn? was originally developed with Mark Travis. First presented as a “member’s project” by Joseph Siravo at the Ensemble Studio Theatre in New York, then cut short by 9/11 after only two performances, it moved to Los Angeles and worked-shopped at TheatreTheatre as well as The Tamarind Theatre, where it ran for 24 weeks.

It premiered for critics in the prestigious Assembly Rooms at The Edinburgh Festival, and later opened the Edgemar Center for the Arts’ Kaleidoscope Festival in Santa Monica under Larry Moss’ direction.

The New York Times called Who Is Floyd Stearn? “the best family confessional play they’ve seen” and The New York Post named Raynor to a "2005 Galaxy of New Stars" list after the Off-Broadway run produced by his childhood friend, Rick Waxman.

The JewishJournal.com wrote an article about Who is Floyd Stearn? which painted a picture of the emotional turmoil Raynor has faced while dealing with his father's absence.

Howard Stern was so moved by the production, he wrote Raynor and talked about his own relationship with his father. Stern's voice is featured on the YouTube video promo talking about his view of the show and impressions of Raynor's performance.

Personal life

At age 13, Raynor was Bar Mitzvah'd at the Temple Emanuel on 5th Avenue in New York City Manhattan.

Raynor changed his name at 18 years of age from Michael Roy Stearn to Michael Raynor when he was adopted by his then stepfather, John Raynor. At that time, he had not seen or heard from his biological father, Floyd Dampsey Stearn since the age of 7.

Raynor reconnected with his paternal grandmother who was able to answer many of Raynor's questions about his father. Based on interviews with relatives and his experiences and personal anguish with his biological father, he grew up to write and act in the one man show, Who Is Floyd Stearn? which talks about his struggle to understand the mystery behind the man Floyd Stearn.

Raynor was in a long-term relationship with American actress Erica Gimpel from 1988-2004.

In the memoir Standing Up, by Marion Grodin, the daughter of Charles Grodin, Raynor's relationship with her is depicted in detail. Grodin and Raynor were teenage sweethearts.

Filmography

Film

Television

References

External links
  of Michael Raynor. Includes Biography/Filmography, photos, video and current projects
 
 Projects at LarryMoss.org, official site of Larry Moss, acting coach and director of Who Is Floyd Stearn?
 YouTube video promo Who is Floyd Stearn? featuring the voice of Howard Stern

1961 births
20th-century American male actors
21st-century American male actors
Film producers from New York (state)
American male film actors
American male television actors
Jewish American male actors
Living people
Male actors from New York City
People from Queens, New York
Film directors from New York City
Friends Seminary alumni
People from the Upper East Side
21st-century American Jews